The Gnome-Rhône 14N was a 14-cylinder two-row air-cooled radial engine designed and manufactured by Gnome-Rhône just before the start of World War II. A development of the Gnome-Rhône 14K, the 14N was used on several French and even one German aircraft.

Design and development
The 14K's reliability was poor, so Gnome-Rhône carried out major redesign, using different materials for the pistons and valves, and enlarging the cooling fins to increase surface area by 39%.

The 14N was introduced in 1937 and was quickly installed on several aircraft models. In 1939, minor improvements allowed Gnome-Rhône to increase the compression ratio from 6.1:1 to 6.8:1, which increased power.

The 14N was further developed into the Gnome-Rhône 14R featuring a 2-stage supercharger, but this type was not widely used until after World War II as production of improved engines was restricted by the armistice with Germany.

Variants
Data from:Aircraft engines of the World 1945, Aircraft engines of the World 1946

14N-2: Left hand (LH) rotation, 
14N-3: Right hand (RH) rotation version of N-2

14N-10: LH rotation, 
14N-11: RH rotation version of N-10

14N-16: LH rotation, 
14N-17: RH rotation version of N-16

14N-20: LH rotation, 
14N-21: RH rotation version of N-20

14N-44: LH rotation, 
14N-45: RH rotation version of N-44

14N-48: LH rotation, 
14N-49: RH rotation version of N-48

14N-50: LH rotation, 

14N-54: LH rotation, 
14N-55: RH rotation version of N-54

14N-58: LH rotation, 
14N-59: RH rotation version of N-58

Applications

Specifications (14N-48)

See also
 Pratt & Whitney R-1830 a comparable engine sometimes fitted as an alternative to the 14N on French designs
 BMW 801
 Bristol Hercules
 Bristol Taurus
 Fiat A.74
 Mitsubishi Kinsei
 Nakajima Sakae
 Piaggio P.XIX
 Shvetsov ASh-82
 Tumansky M-88
 Wright R-1820

References

Citations

Bibliography
 Danel, Raymond and Cuny, Jean. L'aviation française de bombardement et de renseignement 1918-1940 Docavia n°12, Editions Larivière

Aircraft air-cooled radial piston engines
1930s aircraft piston engines
14N